The 2011 Taraba State gubernatorial election was the 5th gubernatorial election of Taraba State. Held on April 26, 2011, the People's Democratic Party nominee Danbaba Suntai won the election, defeating Ahmed Yusuf of the Congress for Progressive Change.

Results 
A total of 11 candidates contested in the election. Danbaba Suntai from the People's Democratic Party won the election, defeating Ahmed Yusuf from the Congress for Progressive Change. Valid votes was 716,769.

References 

Taraba gubernatorial
Taraba State gubernatorial elections
April 2011 events in Nigeria